Agdangan is a railway station located on the South Main Line in Quezon, Philippines. It is still use for the Bicol Express and Isarog Limited.

History
Agdangan was opened on May 10, 1916, then located in Unisan, as part of the expansion of the Main Line South to Calauag. It became part of the newly-established town of Agdangan in 1939.

References

Philippine National Railways stations
Railway stations in Quezon
Railway stations opened in 1916